The Fire Temple of Amol, also known as Atashkadeh Amol or Amol Atash Kadeh or Shams Tabarsi Amuli, is a temple in Amol, Mazandaran, Iran. It related to the period Sassanid (226- 651 CE) antiquity building. This building has been damaged over time.

Muhammad ibn Mahmud Amuli is said to be buried in this place.

References

Zoroastrianism in Iran
Fire temples in Iran
Tourist attractions in Amol
Tourist attractions in Mazandaran Province

National works of Iran